Vardavar or Vartavar (Homshetsi: Vartevor or Behur) is an Armenian festival in Armenia where people drench each other with water.

Origin
Vardavar's history dates back to pagan times. The ancient festival is traditionally associated with the goddess Astghik, who was the goddess of water, beauty, love, and fertility. The festivities associated with this religious observance of Astghik were named “Vartavar” because Armenians offered her roses as a celebration (vart means "rose" in Armenian and var means "to burn/be burning", this is why it was celebrated in the harvest time). Some claim it comes from a tradition dating back to Noah, in which he commanded that his descendants should sprinkle water on each other and let doves fly as a symbol of remembrance of the Flood.

The historian of ancient religions Albert de Jong explains that the water rite of Vardavar bears strong resemblance to a similar rite of the Iranian Zoroastrians of Yazd as part of the festival of Tir-o-Tištar.

Date 

Vardavar is generally celebrated 98 days (14 weeks) after Easter in the republic. In some regions, however, it is held on different days, and traditions differ too.

Festival

During the day of Vardavar, people from a wide array of ages are allowed to douse strangers with water. It is common to see people pouring buckets of water from balconies on unsuspecting people walking below them. The festival is very popular among children as it is one day where they can get away with pulling pranks. It is also a means of refreshment on the usually hot and dry summer days of July or late June.

Federation of Youth Clubs of Armenia (FYCA) each year organizes the "Vardavar International Festival" which is cognitive, educational, cultural festival. Every year it takes place in medieval monastery of Geghard and old pagan temple of Garni. The festival aims to present the Armenian national and traditional culture.

In addition to the celebrations, the traditional ceremony of splashing water on each other and the blessings of the youth, the Armenian folk songs are also included and performed by the Nairyan Vocal Ensamble. The Vardavar holiday theme pavilions represent the traditions and handmade works of different regions of Armenia.

Outside Armenia 
Vardavar is also celebrated by Armenians in Russia

Gallery

References

External links
Vardavar. No comment Voice of America
Midsummer fun: Armenians pour water on each other to bridge pagan and Christian traditions
Vardevar (abovyan.com)
Vardavar 2005

Armenian culture
Holidays based on the date of Easter
Observances in Armenia
Armenian festivals
June observances 
July observances
Summer events in Armenia